South Park Rally is a 2000 kart-style racing video game based on the American animated sitcom South Park published by Acclaim Entertainment (near the end of the third season of the show) and released for the PlayStation, Microsoft Windows, Nintendo 64, and Dreamcast. Gameplay follows the player in a competitive racing championship set in the fictional town of South Park. Players are given the options for multiplayer, arcade, or championship modes, but only the championship unlocks extra features. Competition begins in South Park's 1st Rally, a circuit race around four checkpoints in the downtown area of South Park. Races get gradually more diverse, with more locations, racers, and elements added as the game progresses.

Following South Park (1998) and South Park: Chef's Luv Shack (1999), the game's development was handled by Tantalus Interactive and includes characters, vehicles, locations, items and other features inspired by or featured on the series. It was developed simultaneously for all major consoles during the time of its release. Version differences include the number of unlockable characters and stages, with the Nintendo 64 version being on the low end of features due to hardware limitations.

South Park Rally received mixed-to-poor reviews from critics. Criticism derived from the differences between the two major home console ports, Nintendo 64 and PlayStation, as well as the general lack of innovation over other kart-style racers such as Mario Kart 64. South Park Rally would become the last South Park game by Acclaim Entertainment and the last home game in the franchise until South Park: The Stick of Truth in 2013. Series creators Trey Parker and Matt Stone would go on to ridicule Acclaim's games based on their series in later years.

Gameplay 
Gameplay in South Park Rally is divided into three game modes: championship, arcade, and multiplayer.
 Championship: The main focus of the game, which has 14 different races (additional races in the Dreamcast version), all of which have to be done in order. This is the only mode where characters and tracks can be unlocked.
 Arcade: A practice mode allowing the player to choose any unlocked character on any unlocked track to race.
 Multiplayer: A race allowing two to four players to choose any unlocked characters on any unlocked track and race.

Plot 
The Mayor of South Park has decided to stage a rally series that will take place through the heart and outskirts of the town. Favorite characters from the popular television series are included and are able to make use of destructive automobiles, including police cars, mini Porsches, Big Gay Al buggies, wheat bags, jeeps and dozens of other vehicles.

Characters who appear in power-up form include Mr. Hankey, Saddam Hussein, the Underpants Gnomes, Frida, Sparky and Kitty.

Development 
Development on the title – based on Tantalus' own concept – was done on three platforms simultaneously, and took seven months. The game was developed by 20 people. South Park Rally was the third video game based on the series, as Acclaim had also published the games South Park (1998) and South Park: Chef's Luv Shack (1999).

South Park creators Trey Parker and Matt Stone had little to do with the development of South Park Rally (as well as the two other Acclaim releases), although they did contribute a number of original lines of voice acting for it, as they do most of the voices on the show.

Reception 

South Park Rally received negative reviews on all platforms according to the review aggregation website GameRankings. Greg Orlando of NextGens March 2000 issue said of the Nintendo 64 version, "Someone shoehorned the South Park license onto a rather (pardon the pun) middle-of-the-road cart-racing game. Rent it if you must, but buy it only if Messrs. Stone and Parker really need to put down payments on solid-gold houses." Six issues later, Jeff Lundrigan said that the Dreamcast version "would make an amusing rental for a party. Otherwise, steer clear."

Mark Green of N64 Magazine gave the Nintendo 64 version 88%, saying that it "has innovation, excitement, and just about every South Park character ever, all rolled into one package." Kevin "BIFF" Giacobbi of GameZone gave the PC version eight out of ten, saying that it was, "For those South Park fans... definitely a title worth adding to your collection." Cam Shea of Hyper gave the PlayStation version 49%, saying, "As wacky as throwing Chef's Salty Chocolate Balls at someone may sound, it really isn't very exciting watching a blob of brown fired at a mess of pixels." Lou Gubrious of GamePro said of the same PlayStation version, "Playing South Park Rally will probably cause pain in most gamers. The worst pain comes from knowing that this game wastes a potentially great concept because of flawed execution." The Freshman stated similarly that the Nintendo 64 version "just seems like a shameless attempt to tack South Parks name on a bad racing game to make it sell. With bland graphics, random and repetitive sound samples, and frustrating control, this game gets stomped easily by the much better kart-racers on N64. Unless you love everything with the South Park name, you'd be best advised to take the bypass and skip the town of South Park entirely."

AllGame gave the Nintendo 64 and PC versions each a score of three-and-a-half stars out of five, with Joe Ottoson saying of the former, "If you're a fan of the Mario Kart brand of racing games out there, South Park Rally puts up an entertaining race. South Park fans probably won't be disappointed either as the powerups and sound effects are all nicely twisted so that they mock all that is pure and good in a small town's holiday celebrations"; and Cal Nguyen saying of the latter, "While South Park Rally has its moments, most racing fans will probably be reluctant to get downright serious with this game, provided they can even muster passing the first race! However, South Park, go-kart and comedy fans will no doubt enjoy the humor and simple gameplay for what it is, 'mmm'kay?'" However, Steve Bauman of Computer Games Strategy Plus gave the latter two stars out of five, calling it "a charmless little mess, a superficially fun-looking game with fun-killing gameplay."

Over time, Parker and Stone have publicly criticized Acclaim and the quality of the games as well.

Sales
The game sold more than 1 million copies on the Nintendo 64 alone.

Notes

References

External links 
 

2000 video games
Dreamcast games
Kart racing video games
Nintendo 64 games
PlayStation (console) games
Racing video games
Video games based on South Park
Video games set in Colorado
Video games developed in Australia
Windows games
Multiplayer and single-player video games
Cultural depictions of Saddam Hussein
Acclaim Entertainment games
Tantalus Media games